Last Falling is an American rock band fronted by multi-instrumentalist Bryan Ferguson. The original lineup formed in 1998 under the name "The Accelerators", revising the band name later in 2003. According to Ferguson, Last Falling has become more of a reflection of himself, being the youngest of four siblings by eleven years. The first homemade CD of 3 songs entitled 3 Song EP was released in 2003, featuring songs written while under the previous band name. It was self-produced and circulated at local shows for free with a limited number of copies.

A year later in 2004 came a 4-song EP entitled And The Tree Was Happy. The album featured hit song "Heroine No. 1 "and was recorded and produced by Bryan's brother, Daniel Ferguson, in the childhood home at which Ferguson resided. In 2005, Last Falling recorded In Loving Memory at Sound Image in Van Nuys, CA.  This proved to be the only album that was recorded in a professional studio next to legendary Sound City Studios, which Dave Grohl helped make a documentary for in 2013.

After mild success over the years, the band hit a falling out in 2008 as Ferguson stepped back to focus on his personal life and family. The passing of Ferguson's father in February 2016 - notable "Boss Jock" and  National Radio Hall of Fame personality, Charlie Tuna - sent Ferguson back into the studio to pursue his passion for music once again.

The Charlie Tuna Show

Ferguson produces and hosts a podcast titled The Charlie Tuna Show, officially launched on March 1, 2020. Bryan and his older brother Daniel are curating Charlie's best highlights, and each week (Sundays) a new show will feature clips from Charlie's past shows, air-checks, interviews, and personal commentary from Bryan. This podcast is the first of its kind where the son of a well-known radio personality is hosting and producing his father's content.

Musical Discography

Albums
 Fuel (2002) self-released under band name The Accelerators in Japan under record label Revel Yell
 In Loving Memory (2006) self-released | Available via Bandcamp

Singles, EPs And Limited Releases
 Demo (1997) self-released under band name The Mainliners
 3 Song EP (2003) self-released
 Callus Heart (2004) self-released
 And The Tree Was Happy (2005) self-released | Available via Bandcamp
 Live And Acoustic (2005) self-released

External links
Charlie Tuna Official Website
Last Falling Official Website

Indie rock musical groups from California
Musical groups from Los Angeles